The B5 version of the Volkswagen Passat, based on the Volkswagen Group B5 platform, was launched in 1997 in North America and Europe as well as during March 1998 in Australia.

Design

The Passat introduced a new design language, first seen on the Concept 1 concept car, for the latest generation of Volkswagens such as the Mk4 Golf, Bora, and Polo Mk4. The design with raked windscreens and smooth underpinnings helped give the B5 Passat sedan a 0.27 coefficient of drag. The B5 Passat included higher-quality interior trim and the availability of luxury options to differentiate it in the marketplace. 

The car featured fully independent four-link front suspension; and a semi-independent torsion beam for front-wheel-drive models or a fully independent suspension on the 4motion 4WD models. The 4WD version was introduced in 1997 as an option for the 1.8, 2.8 V6, 1.9 TDI, and 2.5 V6 TDI engines, using a second-generation Torsen T-2 based 4WD system to minimise loss of traction. The 1.8 L petrol engine in the Passat and Audi A4 has a lower oil capacity than transverse applications of the same engine ( in transverse,  longitudinal). Three transmission options were available: a 5-speed manual, a 6-speed manual (codename 01E), and a 5-speed automatic transmission with tiptronic. There was also a 4-speed automatic transmission, available only in 66kW and 81kW 1.9 L TDI, as well as some gasoline models.

The B5 generation does not have individual fog lights. They are built into the headlight itself. There is a model with two rear and two front fog lights (from 1998), and there is a model with two rear fog lights and one in the front. The facelifted model included individual fog lights.

B5 awards 
 1999 Used Car Buyer Greatest Used Buy Awards – Most Sensible Car Award Overall & Best Family Car
 1999 Auto Express New Car Honours – Best Family Car
 1998 What Car? Car of Cars – Best Medium Car
 1998 Which? Best Buy – Large family car market winner

2001 Facelift (Passat B5.5) 

B5 Passat models built after late 2000, also known as B5.5 models, received minor styling and mechanical revisions including revised projector-optic headlights, bumpers, taillights, and chrome trim.

A 4.0 L W8 engine producing  was introduced with a luxury version that included standard 4motion all-wheel drive. This engine was intended to be a test bed for Volkswagen Group's new W engine technology, which would later make an appearance on the W12 in the Phaeton and Audi A8, and the W16 engine in the Bugatti Veyron.

In 2003, a 2.0 L Turbocharged Direct Injection (TDI) diesel engine producing  was added (making the Passat the only mid-sized diesel-powered car sold in the U.S.). This variant was available from 2003 until 2005.

A lengthened platform went on to underpin the 'Passat' that was introduced in China in December 1999 by Shanghai-Volkswagen. This long-wheelbase version was rebadged and launched in Europe as the Škoda Superb in 2001. Both have a  longer wheelbase and length than the standard B5 Passat. An updated version called the Passat Lingyu was released in late November 2005, which has the 1.8-litre turbocharged EA113, the 2.0 L EA113, and the 2.8 L BBG V6 petrol engines.

B5.5 trim levels 
In the United Kingdom, trim levels were E, S, Sport, SE, V5, V6, and Highline. The E trim level had a 1.6 L  engine only. The S trim level was considered well-equipped by the motoring press at the time, and What Car? magazine recommended the 1.8 S as the best version in 1999. SE models had the same engines as the S version, but were better equipped. The V5 models had a 2.3 V5 engine, the V6 was available with a 2.8 V6, or  2.5 TDI.

Models sold in Europe and the Republic of Ireland were similar apart from the trim level naming schemes; the trim levels were Volkswagen's "lifestyle" naming scheme: Comfortline, Trendline, and Highline. A base model was also available.

Models sold in the U.S. had the 1.8 L 20-valve turbo four-cylinder engine, 2.0 TDI, the 2.8 V6, or 4.0 W8; trim levels were GL (2003 onward), GLS, GLX, and W8 (2002–2004). The W8 was only available with the 4motion four-wheel-drive system and a slightly higher trim than the GLX models. The V6 engine had 4motion as an option, as did the 1.8 T starting in the 2004 model year. The GLX trim was only sold with the V6.

Versions sold in Mexico are the same as their European equivalents.

B5.5 awards 
 2001 Auto Express Used Car Honours 2001 – Best Family Used Car
 2001 Diesel Car 2001 Awards – Overall Diesel Car of the Year & Best Family Car
 2000 Used Car Buyer: Used the Year – Overall winner & Best Family Car
 2000 Auto Express Used Car Honours – Best Family Car
 2000 Auto Express New Car Honours – Best Family Car
 2000 Fleet World Honours – Best Fleet Car

Engines 
The internal combustion engines used are shared with many other vehicles in the Volkswagen Group.

References 

Passat B5
Euro NCAP large family cars
Front-wheel-drive vehicles
All-wheel-drive vehicles
Sedans
Station wagons
Cars powered by VR engines
Cars introduced in 1996
2000s cars

simple:Volkswagen Passat#Passat Mk5